Granuloma multiforme  is a cutaneous condition most commonly seen in central Africa, and rarely elsewhere, characterized by skin lesions that are on the upper trunk and arms in sun-exposed areas. It may be confused with tuberculoid leprosy, with which it has clinical similarities. The condition was first noted by Gosset in the 1940s, but it was not until 1964 that Leiker coined the term to describe "a disease resembling leprosy" in his study in Nigeria.

See also 
 Skin lesion

References

External links 

Monocyte- and macrophage-related cutaneous conditions